Excess Flesh is a 2015 American horror film directed by Patrick Kennelly, written by Sigrid Gilmer and Kennelly, and starring Bethany Orr and Mary Loveless.  Orr and Loveless play the gorgeous new roommates who share an obsession with food.

Plot 
Jealous of her very thin supermodel roommate Jennifer, the midsized Jill binges and purges in an attempt to maintain her weight.  Their relationship becomes even more strained as Jennifer mocks Jill's issues.  Overcome with hatred, Jill lashes out at her roommate and chains Jennifer to the wall, where she taunts her with food. As Jill falls further into madness, her hygiene suffers, as does the cleanliness of the apartment. None of this seems to concern the women's neighbors and the love interest of the movie as they come to try to check on the women, and Jennifer continues to insult Jill even while restrained.

Jennifer manages to escape at one point and Jill manages to catch up to her on the street just as police officers in passing notice the girls' state of near undress. Despite having officers there, Jennifer says nothing. Jill attributes Jennifer's catatonic state to insomnia and stress and manages to get Jennifer back to the apartment. Jill bathes Jennifer, telling her how she was worried and scared about her. Jennifer finally tries to call for help and Jill strangles her into unconsciousness. Pushed to the edge by Jennifer's continual abuse, Jill finally stabs her to death and envisions taking her place on the modeling stage; however, Jill is seen still alone in the dirty apartment, implying that Jennifer only existed in Jill's mind.

Cast 
 Bethany Orr as Jill
 Mary Loveless as Jennifer
 Wes McGee as Rob
 Sheresade Poblet as Cathy
 Jill Jacobson as Beverly
 Dana L. Wilson as Becky
 Kristin Minter as Nina
 Robert Maffia as Officer Jimmy
 Jules Bruff as Office Marie
 Juan Riedinger as Sebastian
 Doug Locke as Terence
 Saif Xnaydra as Young Hollywood
Allen Rueckert as Trevor

Production 
Kennelly came up with the idea for the film ten years prior its release after reading about eating disorders and how they can physicalize mental issues.  The isolation of living in Los Angeles was another inspiration, and Kennelly said that the situations in the story came from his and co-writer Gilmer's experiences.  Kennelly wanted to create a horror film using the tropes of romantic comedies and sitcoms, genres that he said he found scary.  Kennelly enjoys films that confront and challenge audiences, and he wanted this film to do the same.  Kennelly had gone to school with Loveless and believed that she would be good for the role of Jennifer.  Orr was cast after auditioning.  The film was shot mostly in sequence.  Orr and Loveless said that this contributed to developing a better understanding of their characters.  There was also a practical reason: the apartment had to be progressively destroyed throughout the story.  Due to the trashed set and food that was required to be left out, the crew wore masks.  Orr said that she found her character to be an unlikely hero despite her being "brutally flawed".  Shooting lasted for three weeks, and many scenes were done in four or less takes.  Orr said that she spent so much time getting into character that it was difficult for her when shooting ended.  Kennelly said of the film, "Excess Flesh is a visualization of what goes on inside a woman's head. It's about the nightmare of the self in the modern world."

The film's score was composed and produced by Jonathan Snipes, best known as a member of noise-rap group clipping.

Release 
Excess Flesh premiered at South by Southwest on March 13, 2015.  Midnight Releasing will release the film on DVD and video on demand on March 8, 2016.

Reception 
Marc Savlov of The Austin Chronicle compared it to Nick Zedd's Cinema of Transgression and said that it is "nauseating, perceptive, and an altogether damning indictment of a hyper-consumerist society run amuck".  Writing in The Daily Beast, Marlow Stern called it "the most twisted movie at SXSW—and of the year, so far".  Susanna Jackson of WBUR-FM wrote that it is "handled both thoughtfully and perhaps over gratuitously".  Shock Till You Drop's Samuel Zimmerman wrote, "This is a film as informed by the veneer of Los Angeles as it is sickened by it; a layer cake of aggression, shame and madness. It's pretty exhilarating."  Matt Donato of We Got This Covered rated it 2.5/5 stars and wrote, "Excess Flesh starts out by asking the right questions about body shaming, but it quickly crumbles like a stale, tasteless fruitcake that's meant only for decoration."  Heather Wixson of Daily Dead rated it 2/5 stars and wrote that the film is not as clever or insightful as it seems to think it is.

References

External links 
 
 
 Video interview at Collider.com

2015 films
2015 horror films
American independent films
American body horror films
Films about food and drink
2010s English-language films
2010s American films